"Baby, You're a Rich Man" is a song by the English rock band the Beatles that was released as the B-side of their "All You Need Is Love" single in July 1967. It originated from an unfinished song by John Lennon, titled "One of the Beautiful People", to which Paul McCartney added a chorus.  It is one of the best-known pop songs to make use of a clavioline, a monophonic keyboard instrument that was a forerunner to the synthesizer. Lennon played the clavioline on its oboe setting, creating a sound that suggests an Indian shehnai. The song was recorded and mixed at Olympic Sound Studios in London, making it the first of the Beatles' EMI recordings to be entirely created outside EMI Studios.

Lennon wrote his portion of the song after attending the 14 Hour Technicolor Dream, an all-night festival held at London's Alexandra Palace that served as a key event in the emergence of the counterculture in the UK. His lyrics address the "beautiful people" of the 1960s hippie movement and combine with the chorus to present a statement on the universality of non-material wealth. The lyrics have also invited interpretation as a message to the Beatles' manager, Brian Epstein, and alternatively as a comment on fame. George Harrison performed the song during his visit to San Francisco's Haight-Ashbury district in August 1967, at the height of the Summer of Love. The track later appeared on the Beatles' Magical Mystery Tour album. Parts of it were used in their 1968 animated film Yellow Submarine.

"Baby, You're a Rich Man" peaked at number 34 on America's Billboard Hot 100 chart. Among reviewers' varied comments on the song, Billboard admired it as "an Eastern-flavored rocker with an infectious beat and an intricate lyric", while Pitchfork has dismissed it as "a second-rate take on John Lennon's money-isn't-everything theme". In 2010, Rolling Stone ranked "Baby, You're a Rich Man" at number 68 on its list of the "100 Greatest Beatles Songs". The Fat Boys, Kula Shaker and the Presidents of the United States of America are among the artists who have covered the song. The Beatles recording was used at the end of the 2010 film The Social Network, about the rise of Facebook.

Background

"Baby, You're a Rich Man" was the result of combining two unfinished songs written by Lennon and McCartney, in a similar fashion to "A Day in the Life" and "I've Got a Feeling". The working title, based on Lennon's verses, was "One of the Beautiful People", to which McCartney added the "Baby, you're a rich man" chorus. In a 1980 interview, Lennon described it as "two separate pieces ... forced into one song". The two songwriters worked on the composition at McCartney's London home, on Cavendish Avenue in St John's Wood.

During the 1960s, "beautiful people" was the term adopted by Californian hippies to refer to themselves. According to author Barry Miles, who was among the leading figures in the UK underground in 1967, Lennon drew inspiration for the song from newspaper articles on the emerging hippie phenomenon. It is thought that McCartney wrote his section about the band's manager, Brian Epstein. Lennon's lyrics are in the form of a question-and-answer exchange, similar to that used by him and McCartney in "With a Little Help from My Friends". Musicologist Walter Everett writes that the song "asks an unnamed Brian Epstein what it's like to be one of the 'beautiful people'"; Everett adds: "This appellation was used of both communal hippies and those who mingle with the most celebrated entertainers." Lennon claimed that the meaning of the song was that everybody is a rich man, saying, "The point was stop moaning. You're a rich man and we're all rich men." George Harrison said the message was that all individuals are wealthy within themselves, regardless of material concerns.

According to author and critic Ian MacDonald, Lennon was most likely inspired to write the verses after attending the 14 Hour Technicolor Dream, an all-night festival held at Alexandra Palace in north London on 29 April 1967. Attended by 10,000 people, this musical and performance art event was a fundraiser for the proprietors of the underground newspaper International Times, after a police raid had forced the closure of their offices; in MacDonald's description, it marked the first large-scale coming together of Britain's "beautiful people". Writing in 1981 on the musical and societal developments of 1967, sociomusicologist Simon Frith said that this event was one of the "multi-media happenings" that reflected the new aesthetic represented by English psychedelia, whereby "Dancing became less important than listening" and fashion embraced vivid colours while retaining "the mod concern for looking smart". Frith added: "Psychedelia was essentially elitist but the joy of psychedelic pop was that it made everyone part of the elite."

Composition
The song's principal key is G major in Mixolydian mode, and the time signature throughout is 4/4. Its structure comprises an intro, two verses and a chorus, followed by a third verse and repeated choruses. From its opening chord of G major, the verses introduce a VII/I (Fadd9/G), a chord change that constitutes a pedal point on G (sustained harmonic tone) and so recalls some of the Beatles' Indian-inspired melodies from Revolver. Among musicologists, Everett says that from the seventh bar of the verse, C major is revealed as the true key, whereas Alan Pollack writes that the emphasis given to C major at the end of the musical phrases instead suggests "a perilously high center of gravity with respect to G being the home key". The Indian influence is heightened on the band's recording of the song through the use of gamak melodies in the accompaniment. Pollack considers a notable aspect of the chorus to be the bass move from C to G via a III (B). According to MacDonald, the song's loose, swinging rhythm, which he describes as "chugging pseudo-march", suggests the influence of the Four Tops' 1966 hit single "Reach Out I'll Be There".

Author and critic Kenneth Womack comments that the lyrics appear to "address issues of wealth and celebrity" for listeners unfamiliar with the countercultural concept of "beautiful people". The song reflects the Beatles' disdain for consumerism and materialism, a theme that, inspired by the band members' use of the hallucinogenic drug LSD, they introduced in the lyrics to Revolver tracks such as "And Your Bird Can Sing". Authors Russell Reising and Jim LeBlanc highlight the lines "You keep all your money in a big brown bag inside a zoo / What a thing to do" as particularly dismissive of the acquisition and hoarding of material wealth. The same authors recognise an element of ridicule towards some of the "beautiful people", specifically those that, in Lennon's words, travel no further than "As far as the eye can see" and, even then, see "Nothing that doesn't show". Music critic Tim Riley identifies a droll quality in the answers that Lennon provides to his own questions. With regard to the song's message, he writes: "It's clear that they understand their position: if the Beatles are beautiful people, by extension their listeners become beautiful people ('Baby, you're a rich man, too')."

Recording

The recording of "Baby, You're a Rich Man" took place during a period when, free of deadlines following the completion of their album Sgt. Pepper's Lonely Hearts Club Band in April 1967, the Beatles worked on songs for the United Artists animated film Yellow Submarine and for what became the band's television film Magical Mystery Tour. They recorded "Baby, You're a Rich Man" in a six-hour session, starting at 9 pm on 11 May, at Olympic Sound Studios in Barnes, south-west London. The session marked a rare example of the Beatles recording outside of EMI's facility at Abbey Road, after the band had briefly used Regent Sound in central London during the sessions for Sgt. Pepper. The engineers assisting George Martin, the Beatles' producer, were Olympic manager Keith Grant and Eddie Kramer. Mick Jagger, whose band the Rolling Stones regularly used the same studio, also attended the session.

The song was mixed, in mono only, that same day. The music features an unusual oboe-like sound reminiscent of an Indian shehnai, which was created with a clavioline, an early, three-octave forerunner of the synthesizer. Being a monophonic keyboard, it was capable of sounding only one note at a time; according to music journalist Gordon Reid, citing a report from the session, Lennon created the trill sound "by rolling an orange up and down the keyboard" of the clavioline. Musicologist William Echard cites the clavioline part as an example of a psychedelic feature he calls a "garble line" – a musical part that "often meanders widely through pitch space, following a rhythmic profile that does not adhere strongly to the prevailing harmonic or melodic logic" – with "Orientalist connotations". A feed back delay effect known as spin-echo was used to fill from the end of one line of the verse to the start of the next. After Lennon had played piano on the basic track, McCartney overdubbed a second part, which enters at 1:45 and is heard in reverse over the third verse. In its doubling of the vocal line, Harrison's lead guitar mirrors the role of a sarangi in an Indian khyal vocal piece, an effect that Harrison first used on Lennon's song "Lucy in the Sky with Diamonds".

Following the completion of Sgt. Pepper in late April 1967, the Beatles' recording sessions for the remainder of that year have been dismissed as uninspired by the majority of commentators. Kramer contests this view, however; he says of the Beatles' collaboration on "Baby, You're a Rich Man": "The energy level was so intense … that you were riding wave upon wave of amazing creativity. It was like watching a well-oiled machine. Just incredible." According to another Olympic staff engineer, Grant and Kramer were highly complimentary of Lennon as a vocalist and "couldn't believe anyone could sing that well". Aside from the clavioline part, overdubs on the track included maracas and tambourine, and vibraphone played by Kramer. Only a single note of the vibraphone is clearly audible throughout the track, at the 0:53 mark. McCartney recalled the six-hour session as an energetic one and "rather exciting", adding: "Keith Grant mixed it, instantly, right there. He stood up at the console as he mixed it, so it was a very exciting mix, we were really quite buzzed."

During the session, Lennon changed a line in the chorus to "Baby, you're a rich fag Jew". According to author Bob Spitz, this was either a joke at the expense of Epstein or a provocation in reaction to the band's former moptop image. Spitz writes that the session tapes also reveal Lennon improvising similarly "wicked" remarks about McCartney, Ringo Starr and Jagger. Partly as a result of these disruptions, the Beatles required twelve takes before they achieved a satisfactory rhythm track. The group enjoyed working at Olympic Sound, which was an independent facility, free of record company control. They returned to Barnes on 14 June to record the basic track for "All You Need Is Love".

Release
"Baby, You're a Rich Man" was initially submitted for inclusion in Yellow Submarine. While parts of the song were used in the film, its initial release was as the B-side of "All You Need Is Love", which the Beatles performed on the Our World satellite broadcast on 25 June 1967 and then rush-released as a single. The release took place on 7 July in the United Kingdom and on 17 July in the United States. "All You Need Is Love" topped singles charts in many countries around the world. In the United States, the B-side also charted in its own right, peaking at number 34 on the Billboard Hot 100 and number 60 on the Cash Box Top 100. In Australia, it was listed with "All You Need Is Love", as a double A-side, when the single topped the Go-Set national chart.

The single followed soon after Sgt. Pepper, which historian David Simonelli describes as "the most important cultural moment of 1967" through its resonance "across every boundary of class, age, gender, race and geography". Both records provided a soundtrack to that year's Summer of Love, a phenomenon that marked the full emergence of the 1960s counterculture. The Beatles were viewed as leaders of the counterculture and, during July and August, pursued interests related to the same utopian-based ideology. In a 1970 interview, when asked about Haight-Ashbury, the district of San Francisco that represented "the city of the beautiful people" in 1967, Lennon recalled that he was "all for going and living" there, but "George went over in the end." During this visit, on 7 August, Harrison was handed an acoustic guitar in Golden Gate Park and briefly performed "Baby, You're a Rich Man", leading a crowd around in a manner that press reports likened to the Pied Piper of Hamelin.

Although the visit was viewed as the Beatles' endorsement of a youth movement that they helped inspire, Harrison was disappointed at how Haight-Ashbury represented a haven for dropouts and drug addicts, rather than a community looking to explore the possibility of enlightenment that LSD presented. On his return to London, he shared this disillusionment with Lennon. The pair subsequently became avid supporters of Maharishi Mahesh Yogi's Transcendental Meditation technique, after the Beatles had attended a seminar by the Maharishi in Bangor, Wales, where they publicly disavowed LSD on 26 August. In light of this development, author Nicholas Schaffner wrote that "Baby, You're a Rich Man", like "Strawberry Fields Forever", revealed the "redundant" aspect of repeated LSD "trips" after the initial sense of spiritual euphoria awakened by the drug, in that the songs "tend[ed] to provide more riddles than solutions".

Against the Beatles' wishes, Capitol Records, EMI's North American affiliate, included "Baby You're a Rich Man" and other tracks from the band's 1967 singles on the US album Magical Mystery Tour, released in November that year. In the company's rush to prepare the album, a duophonic (or "mock stereo") mix of the song was used for the stereo version of the LP. While parts of the song were used in the 1968 film Yellow Submarine, it was not included on the accompanying soundtrack album. The sequence for "Baby, You're a Rich Man" appears towards the end of the film, when Sgt. Pepper's Lonely Hearts Club Band have been released from the paralysis initiated by the Blue Meanies' hatred of music. Later editions of the US single include a voice saying the end of the word "Seven" or "Eleven" before the track starts.

Critical reception
Writing in the NME in July 1967, Derek Johnson commented on the song's modern qualities relative to the sing-along style of the A-side. He highlighted Lennon's falsetto singing, the recording's "Oriental instrumentation and … unusual shuffle beat, emphasised by handclaps", and concluded: "The whole effect is startling and packed with interest from the word go." Billboards reviewer described it as "an Eastern-flavored rocker with an infectious beat and an intricate lyric". In one of the first cultural essays to acknowledge the Beatles' impact on American culture in a meaningful way, for the journal Partisan Review, Richard Poirier cited both sides of the single as a "particularly brilliant example" of how contemporary British rock bands had "restor[ed] to good standing ... the simplicities that have frightened us into irony and the search for irony". He described the musical backing on "Baby, You're a Rich Man" as "bursts of sitar music and the clip-clopping of Indian song", which combined to "operate in the manner of classical allusion in Pope", and he admired the lyrics' satirical quality, saying that they were superior to Lennon's Edward Lear-inspired poetry writing.

In his feature article on the clavioline for Sound on Sound magazine, Gordon Reid pairs the song with the Tornados' 1962 hit "Telstar" as the two seminal pop recordings made with the instrument. In his assessment of "Baby, You're a Rich Man", Ian MacDonald welcomes the use of clavioline, saying that it evokes "a beguiling joss-stick exoticism", and he praises Starr's drumming as the equal of his performance on the song "Rain". MacDonald bemoans the lack of focus evident in this and other Beatles recordings from the immediate post-Sgt. Pepper period, however; he says that, while "Baby, You're a Rich Man" demonstrates the band's command of musical "feel" and "black-white acid-dance fusion" a year ahead of the Rolling Stones, McCartney's choruses are weak and, overall, the song is devoid of "well-crafted music". Tim Riley says that the July 1967 single offers two pieces that are "Not such bad notions in themselves, except that they sound spent." Riley criticises the song's lyrics as "lacking in purpose" and says that, although the "snake-charming Clavioline" provides a degree of interest, "There's no center to this music … 'Help!' and 'Drive My Car' addressed the fallacies of fame from cynical impulses; 'Baby, You're a Rich Man' flounders in privileged emptiness."

Writing for Mojo in 2003, Martin O'Gorman paired "Baby, You're a Rich Man" with Harrison "It's All Too Much" as two of the Beatles' "most sonically intriguing, but unfocused tracks". In a 2009 review of Magical Mystery Tour, Scott Plagenhoef of Pitchfork dismissed the song as "a second-rate take on John Lennon's money-isn't-everything theme from the considerably stronger 'And Your Bird Can Sing'". He added that it was "the one lesser moment on an otherwise massively rewarding [album]". Dan Caffrey of Consequence of Sound writes that, while it lacks the wholly universal scope of other songs by the band, "it's a nice little Lennon morality ditty on the perils of materialism with some innovative work with the clavioline from Lennon." Music critic Jim DeRogatis considers the track to be one of the Beatles' best psychedelic rock songs and an effective comment on Britain's first major countercultural happening. In 2010, "Baby, You're a Rich Man" was ranked at number 68 in Rolling Stone's list of the 100 greatest Beatles songs. The magazine's editors wrote: "Lennon's deeply stoned delivery and abstract questions about 'the beautiful people' captured the playfully spaced-out mood of the summer of 1967 – a spirit the Beatles were more tapped into than anyone."

Remixes, further releases and cover versions
George Martin and recording engineer Geoff Emerick created the first true stereo mix of the song when preparing a 1971 German release of the Magical Mystery Tour album. Unable to recreate the spin-echo effect that had been introduced at the mixing stage of the original recording, they simply omitted it. The mix was completed on 22 October 1971. It was first made available in Britain in December 1981, when "Baby, You're a Rich Man" was included on a bonus EP containing previously unissued stereo mixes in the box set The Beatles EP Collection.

"Baby, You're a Rich Man" was mixed in stereo for a second time for the 1999 DVD release of the Yellow Submarine film and the accompanying Yellow Submarine Songtrack album. Portions of Lennon's clavioline part appear in the Love version of "Lucy in the Sky with Diamonds", released in 2006. Elements of "Baby, You're a Rich Man" also appear in the remix of "All You Need Is Love", which closes the Love album. In 2009, remastered stereo and mono Magical Mystery Tour CDs were released.

The Beatles' recording plays at the end of The Social Network, a 2010 film directed by David Fincher about the rise of Facebook and its co-founder and CEO Mark Zuckerberg (played by Jesse Eisenberg). Noel Murray and Matt Singer of The Dissolve include this appearance among the five most effective uses of a Beatles song in a feature film, describing it as the "perfect musical summation for The Social Network". According to Inkoo Kang of Slate magazine, the Beatles "sing-taunt" Zuckerberg with the song's chorus; in Murray and Singer's description, "Baby, You're a Rich Man" appears to "ask Zuckerberg all of our questions about what he's done", after he has developed Facebook into a billion-dollar company and, in the final scene, "sits triumphant – and totally alone".

American rappers the Fat Boys covered "Baby, You're a Rich Man" and performed it in the 1987 comedy film Disorderlies. Hip-hop duo P.M. Dawn incorporated the "How does it feel to be one of the beautiful people?" line into their song "The Beautiful", from the 1991 album Of the Heart, of the Soul and of the Cross: The Utopian Experience. They also replicated part of the music from "Baby, You're a Rich Man" in their track, having been denied permission to sample the Beatles' version. The song has also been covered by Kula Shaker, the Presidents of the United States of America and Umphrey's McGee.

Personnel

According to Mark Lewisohn and Ian MacDonald:

The Beatles
 John Lennon – double-tracked lead vocal, piano, clavioline
 Paul McCartney – backing vocals, bass, piano
 George Harrison – backing vocals, rhythm guitar, lead guitar, handclaps
 Ringo Starr – drums, tambourine, maracas, handclaps

Additional musicians
 Eddie Kramer – vibraphone
 Mick Jagger – backing vocals

Charts

Notes

References

Sources

External links
 Full lyrics for the song at the Beatles' official website 
 Keyboard magazine article on replicating the song's clavioline sound

1967 songs
1967 singles
The Beatles songs
Parlophone singles
Capitol Records singles
Songs written by Lennon–McCartney
Song recordings produced by George Martin
Songs published by Northern Songs
The Beatles and India
Psychedelic pop songs
British psychedelic rock songs